Unione Sportiva Dilettantistica Atletico Catania is an Italian association football club founded in 1967 and based in Catania, Sicily. Throughout its history, the club played extensively at Serie C1 and Serie C2 professional level, almost gaining promotion to Serie B on two occasions during the 1990s. The club is currently part of the regionally organized amateur Eccellenza league, following two disbandments that led Atletico Catania down to the bottom ranks of national football.

History
The club was founded in 1967 as Sport Club Mascalucia, then renamed and relocated in 1986 by the Catanese entrepreneur Salvatore Tabita. They won their local title and were thus promoted to Serie C2. After finishing in 10th place in their first season, they went on to change their name in 1989 to Atletico Leonzio and moved to Lentini. The team was then acquired by Franco Proto, and won promotion into Serie C1 in 1993.

In 1994 Proto, trying to satisfy the absence of a football club in the city of Catania, brought the club from Lentini. Their home games were moved to the 21,000 capacity stadium of Stadio Angelo Massimino. This was because Catania's primary and historical club, Calcio Catania, had been cancelled in 1993 by the FIGC; Calcio Catania were however later entered into the Sicilian Eccellenza due to a court decision.

The club changed their name from Atletico Leonzio to Atletico Catania, doing a controversial move, specially in the eyes of the club's fans from Lentini. They played for seven seasons in Serie C, coming close to promotion to Serie B twice, reaching the playoffs in both 1996–97 and 1997–98, but missing out both times.

Recent times
The 2000s have been far more difficult for the club. They were relegated down to the Sicilian Eccellenza in 2001 because of financial difficulties. In 2002 Proto sold the club to Paolo Pinazzo and Gianfranco Vullo. Atletico Catania went on sliding further down, and was again cancelled in 2005, when a group of supporters led by Santino Crisafi founded a new club with the current denomination and registered it to Terza Categoria, the lowest division in Italian football, for the 2005–06 season. That year Atletico Catania reached a fourth place, not enough for gaining promotion. However, little before the beginning of season 2006–07, Atletico Catania won the title of the Sant'Agata li Battiati making them applicable to play in the Prima Categoria. The new club ended its 2006–07 campaign in eighth place. The club was renamed as U.S.D. Atletico Catania for the 2007–08 season, that saw the atletisti winning the Round F of Prima Categoria league, being thus promoted to Promozione for the 2008–09 season. They completed their first Promozione season in eighth place, playing their home games in the neighbouring town of Aci Bonaccorsi. They have moved back to Catania for the 2009–10 season, playing at the Campo Comunale "Zia Lisa". They promoted to Eccellenza Sicily in 2010–11 season but relegated back to Promozione at next season after finishing 14th.

Atletico Catania returned to Eccellenza in 2015, as they were admitted to fill a vacancy in the league. After an immediate relegation, they successively were promoted once again to Eccellenza in 2017 as Promozione winners.

Notable former managers
 Francesco D'Arrigo
 Roberto Morinini
 Pietro Paolo Virdis

Sources
 History of Atletico Catania (from Atletico Catania official website)

External links
 Official website

Football clubs in Italy
Football clubs in Sicily
Association football clubs established in 1967
Serie C clubs
Italian football clubs established in 1967